Ulf Adelsohn (born 4 October 1941) is a Swedish politician, leader of the Moderate Party from 1981 to 1986 and Governor of Stockholm County from 1992 to 2001. He was a member of the Riksdag from 1982 to 1988 and served as Chairman of the Board of SJ AB 2001–2011, from where he resigned due to quarrels with the Reinfeldt cabinet on its railway deregulation policies.

Political career 

Adelsohn studied law at Stockholm University, earning a Candidate of Law degree in 1968. He was the chairman of the Confederation of Swedish Conservative and Liberal Students, opposed the occupation of the Student Union Building in Stockholm in 1968 and was a co-founder of Borgerliga Studenter – Opposition '68 later in the same year.

Adelsohn became the chairman of the Free Moderate Students in 1966–1968,  and became the deputy chairman of the Moderate Party in Stockholm in 1968. He was municipal commissioner for traffic in Stockholm 1973-1976 and was Mayor of Stockholm 1976–1979. He served as Minister of Communications (Transport) in the centre-right government of Thorbjörn Fälldin from 1979 to 1981 and Governor of Stockholm County from 1992 to 2001. Adelsohn was party leader of the Moderate Party from 1981 to 1986, the second largest party (after the dominant Social Democrats) and was thus the leader of the main opposition party in the 1985 election.

From 2001 to 2011 was he chairman of the board for SJ. In 2005 he decided to stand for election for Stockholm City Council again, declaring himself to be a candidate for Speaker of the Council. His candidacy was however withdrawn before the elections in 2006.

Personal life 

Adelsohn was born in Stockholm, Sweden, the son of Oskar Adelsohn and Margareta (née Halling). His paternal grandparents were Polish Jews and his mother was of Swedish descent. 
On the side of his mother, he is a descendant (great-great-great-great-grandson) of Jacob Johan Anckarström; the assassin of Gustav III who was convicted for regicide and executed.

He is married to Lena Adelsohn Liljeroth, who was the Minister for Culture in the Reinfeldt cabinet, and has two children, Erik and Ebba. An avid supporter of Djurgårdens IF, he was at one point chairman of the club's ice hockey department.

References

External links

1941 births
Living people
Governors of Stockholm County
County governors of Sweden
Leaders of the Moderate Party
Mayors of Stockholm
Members of the Riksdag from the Moderate Party
Municipal commissioners of Sweden
Swedish Ministers for Communications
Swedish people of Polish-Jewish descent